This is a list of non-Mongolian footballers who currently play or have played association football in Mongolia.

Armenia 

 Davit Ghandilyan - Deren FC

Brazil 

 Ernani - Erchim FC
 Ruan Felipe Chiquini da Silva - Khangarid FC, Ulaanbaatar club

Cameroon 

 Emmanuel Mbia - Khoromkhon FC

Canada 

 Ryan Fante - Khoromkhon FC, Ulaanbaataryn Unaganuud FC

England 

 Dean O' Brian - Bayangol FC

France 

 Nicolas Vandelli - Erchim FC

Georgia 

 Zviad Tsikolia - Erchim FC

Guam 

 Jonahan Romero - Khoromkhon FC

Italy 

 Mauro Boerchio - Ulaanbaatar City FC
 Giacomo Ratto - Ulaanbaatar City FC
 Federico Zini - Ulaanbaatar City FC
 Rosario Mattia Russo

Ivory Coast 

 Arthur Kouassi - Ulaanbaatar City FC

Japan 

 Tatsuya Sase - Goyo FC
 Yudai Ikeda - Khoromkhon FC
 Eisuke Mohri - Athletic 220 FC
 Shori Murata - Athletic 220 FC
 Ryota Ishikawa - Erchim FC
 Ishino Shuta - Erchim FC
 Reo Nakamura - Erchim FC
 Shuta Ishino - Erchim FC
 Yosuke Minami - Erchim FC, FC Ulaanbaatar
 Seita Ishikawa - Bayangol FC
 Kazutaka Otsu - FC Ulaanbaatar
 Chikara Tashiro - Erchim FC, Athletic 220 FC
 Tatsuya Nishio - Khoromkhon FC, Deren FC
 Mizuho Sasaki - Selenge Press FC, Ulaanbaatar FC, Deren FC
 Shinya Yamamoto  - Selenge Press FC
 Mizuho Sasaki - Selenge Press FC
 Ogino Masahiro - FC Ulaanbaatar 
 Taku Hishida - Selenge Press FC
 Tomoya Kashiwagi - FC Ulaanbaatar
 Keita Tanabe - Deren FC
 Maru Matsuki - Erchim FC
 Norito Hashiguchi - Athletic 220 FC
 Dan Ito - Erchim FC

Morocco 

 Ghassane El Barhami - Ulaanbaatar City FC

Nigeria 

 Olawale Sunday - Bayangol FC
 Ayo Hassan Raimi - Khoromkhon FC
 Michael Adeyemo - Khoromkhon FC
 Samson Amowodu - Khoromkhon FC
 Paul Chukwu Ebuka - Khangarid FC
 Adiwale Hope Nifemy

North Korea 

 Kim Myong-won - FC Ulaanbaatar

Senegal 

 Mamadou Baldé - Arvis FC

Russia 

 Dordzhi Sangadzhiyev - Erchim FC - 2018-
 Ilya Kungurov - Ulaanbaatar City FC
 Alim Zumakulov (Алим Зумакулов) - Selenge Press FC
 Vladimir Ulydyakov (Владимир Ульдяков) - Khangarid FC
 Artyom Sergeyvich - Ulaanbaatar City FC
 Aleksey Nikolayevich - Ulaanbaatar City FC
 Islam Hamhoev - Ulaanbaatar City FC

Serbia 

 Nikola Đuričić - Erchim FC
 Miloš Perišić - Erchim FC, FC Ulaanbaatar
 Milan Sredojević - Erchim FC
 Zoran Pešić - Erchim FC
 Aleksandar Marinković - Deren FC
 Miloš Rnić

Singapore 

 David Low - Khoromkhon FC

Slovenia 

 Uroš Poljanec - Khoromkhon FC

Spain 

 Adrian Rubio Garcia - Bayangol FC
 Jorge Garcia Vidal - Ulaanbaatar City FC

Trinidad and Tobago 

 Seon Power - Ulaanbaatar City FC
 Akil Pompey - Khoromkhon FC

United States 

 Zak Downes - Bayangol FC
 Austin Rogers - Bayangol FC, FC Ulaanbaatar
 Max Lubin - Erchim FC
 Noah Parker
 Nigel Robinson (Pierre) - Khoromkhon FC
 John Walrath - (Selenge Press FC)
 Sean Vinberg - Khoromkhon FC
 Khris Hammock - Khoromkhon FC
 Christopher Scirto - Khoromkhon FC

References

External links
 Foreign Players Select Team
 Foreign Players Association of Mongolia 2016 Facebook Page

Mongolia
Association football player non-biographical articles